The 2017 Pulitzer Prizes were awarded by the Pulitzer Prize Board for work during the 2016 calendar year. Prize winners and nominated finalists were announced by Mike Pride at 3:00 p.m. EST April 10, 2017.

The New York Times won the most awards of any newspaper, with three, bringing its total to one hundred twelve Pulitzer Prizes. The McClatchy Company, Miami Herald, and International Consortium of Investigative Journalists won Investigative reporting, leaving them with a total of fifty-four, twenty-two, and one respectively. The New York Daily News and ProPublica won the prize in public service, bringing their totals to eleven and four, respectively. The East Bay Times won Breaking News Reporting, bringing its total to three prizes. The Salt Lake Tribune won its second Pulitzer. The Charleston Gazette-Mail won its first prize for the combined newspaper.

Journalism

Letters, Drama, and Music

References 

2017
Pulitzer Prize
2017 literary awards
2017 awards in the United States
2017 music awards
April 2017 events in the United States